Alphabetical list of Eastern Christianity-related articles on English Wikipedia

A 

 Abraham the Great of Kashkar
 Abuna
 Albanian Greek-Catholic Church
 Albanian Orthodox Church
 Alexandrian Rite
 Ancient Church of the East
 Antiochene Rite
 Antiochian Orthodox Christian Archdiocese of North America
 Antiochian Orthodox Church
 Archimandrite
 Armenian Apostolic Church
 Armenian Catholic Church
 Armenian Catholic Patriarchs
 Assyrian Church of the East
 Assyrian Evangelical Church
 Athenagoras (Patriarch)
 Autocephaly
 Avvakum

B 

 Babai the Great
 Baptism of Kievan Rus'
 Baradaeus, Jacob
 Beglopopovtsy
 Belarusian Greek Catholic Church
 Belokrinitskaya Hierarchy
 Belokrinitskoe Soglasie
 Binbirkilise
 Blachernitissa
 British Orthodox Church
 Bulgarian Orthodox Church
 Byzantine Catholic Metropolitan Church of Pittsburgh
 Byzantine Discalced Carmelites
 Byzantine Rite

C 

 Cathedral of Christ the Saviour (Moscow)
 Cathedral of the Dormition
 Catholicose of the East
 Catholicos-Patriarch of All Georgia
 Catholic-Orthodox joint declaration of 1965
 Celtic Orthodox Church
 Catholic Chaldean Patriarchs of Babylon
 Chaldean Catholic Church
 Chaldean Syrian Church
 Christians in Iran
 Chora Church
 Church of Greece
 Church of the Holy Apostles
 Church of the Tithes
 Church Slavonic language
 Coptic Christianity
 Coptic Catholic Church
 Coptic language
 Coptic Orthodox Church
 Cypriot Orthodox Church
 Czech and Slovak Orthodox Church

D 

 Danilov Monastery
 Dayro d-Mor Hananyo
 Dayro d-Mor Gabriel
 Desert Fathers
 Divine Liturgy
 Donskoy Monastery
 Dormition of the Theotokos

E 

 East Syriac Rite
 Eastern Orthodox Church
 Eastern Orthodox Church calendar
 Eastern Orthodox Church organization
 Eastern Orthodox Patriarchate of Jerusalem
 Eastern Rite
 Eastern Rite Catholic Churches
 Ecumenical council
 Ecumenical Patriarch
 Encyclical of the Eastern Patriarchs
 Eparchy of Križevci
 Ephrem the Syrian
 Eritrean Orthodox Tewahdo Church
 Ethiopian Orthodox Tewahedo Church

F 

 Fedoseevtsy
 Finnish Orthodox Church
 Florovsky, Georges

G 

 Georgian Orthodox and Apostolic Church
 Great Lent
 Greek-Catholic Melkite Church
 Greek Old Calendarists
 Greek Orthodox Church
 Greek Church of Alexandria
 Gregory Palamas

H 

 Herman of Alaska
 Hesychasm
 Hilandar
 History of Christianity in Ukraine
 History of the Church of the East in Asia
 Holy Fire
 Holy Land
 Holy Synod
 Holy Synod of Jerusalem

I 

 Ilia II
 Indian Orthodox Church
 Italo-Albanian Catholic Church

J 

 Jacobite Orthodox Church
 Japanese Orthodox Church
 Jerusalem Patriarchate in America
 John Chrysostom
 John (Maximovitch) of Shanghai and San Francisco
 Joseph-Volokolamsk Monastery

K 

 Kazan Cathedral
 Kiev Pechersk Lavra
 Khomyakov, Aleksey
 Khutyn Monastery
 Knanaya

L 

 Latin Patriarch of Alexandria
 Latin Patriarch of Antioch
 Latin Patriarch of Constantinople
 Latin Patriarch of Jerusalem
 Lavra
 Lestovka
 Lipovan Orthodox Old-Rite Church
 List of Abunas of Eritrea
 List of Abunas of Ethiopia
 List of Archbishops of Athens
 List of Armenian Catholicoi of Cilicia
 List of Armenian Patriarchs of Constantinople
 List of Armenian Patriarchs of Jerusalem
 List of Catholicoi of Armenia
 List of Coptic Orthodox Popes of Alexandria
 List of Greek Orthodox Patriarchs of Alexandria
 List of Eastern Orthodox jurisdictions in North America
 List of Melkite Greek Catholic Patriarchs of Antioch
 List of Metropolitans and Patriarchs of Moscow
 List of Orthodox Patriarchs of Antioch
 List of Patriarchs of Alexandria
 List of Patriarchs of Antioch
 List of Patriarchs of Constantinople
 List of Syriac Orthodox Patriarchs of Antioch
 Liturgy of Addai and Mari
 Liturgy of the Presanctified Gifts

M 

 Macedonian Orthodox Church
 Major archbishop
 Malabar Independent Syrian Church
 Malankara Jacobite Syriac Orthodox Church
 Mar Thoma Church
 Mark the Evangelist
 Maron, John
 Maronite Church
 Metropolitan Cornelius
 Miaphysitism
 Middle East Council of Churches
 Monolithic church
 Monophysitism
 Mount Athos
 Mystery of Crowning

N 

 Nestorianism
 Nestorius
 Nikolai of Japan

O 

 Old Believers
 Old calendarists
 Old Church Slavonic
 Omophorion
 Optina Monastery
 Oriental Orthodoxy
 Orientalium Ecclesiarum
 Orthodox Church of Antioch
 Orthodox Church of Constantinople
 Orthodox Church in America
 Orthodox Church in Italy
 Orthodox Ohrid Archbishopric

P 

 Panagia
 Patriarch Alexius II
 Patriarch Bartholomew I
 Patriarch Irenaios
 Patriarch of Alexandria
 Paulos (Abune)
 Pimen I (Patriarch)
 Pechersky Ascension Monastery
 Polish Orthodox Church
 Pomorian Old-Orthodox Church
 Popovtsy
 Prosphora

R 

 Rogozhskoye cemetery
 Romanian Church United with Rome, Greek-Catholic
 Romanian Orthodox Church
 Rublev, Andrei
 Russian Greek Catholic Church
 Russian icons
 Russian Old-Orthodox Church
 Russian Orthodox Church
 Russian Orthodox Church Outside of Russia
 Russian Orthodox Old-Rite Church
 Ruthenian Catholic Church

S 

 Sabbah, Michel
 Saint Basil's Cathedral
 Saint Catherine's Monastery
 Saint Sophia Cathedral in Kiev
 Saint Sophia Cathedral in Novgorod
 Saint Thomas Christians
 Saints Cyril and Methodius
 Serbian Orthodox Church
 Sergius (Tikhomirov) of Japan (Metropolitan)
 Sobor
 Sorsky, Nil
 Standing Conference of Orthodox Bishops in America
 Starets
 Studenica monastery
 Sui iuris
 Synod of Diamper
 Syriac Catholic Church
 Syriac Christianity
 Syriac Orthodox Church
 Syro-Malankara Catholic Church
 Syro-Malabar Church

T 

 Tekle Haymanot
 Teoctist
 Theodore of Mopsuestia
 Theodore II of Alexandria (Patriarch)
 Theofilos III of Jerusalem (Patriarch)
 Theotokos of St. Theodore
 Theotokos of Vladimir
 Tikhon of Moscow
 Tokyo Resurrection Cathedral
 Troitse-Sergiyeva Lavra

U 

 Ukrainian Autocephalous Orthodox Church
 Ukrainian Greek Catholic Church
 Ukrainian Orthodox Church - Kiev Patriarchy
 Ukrainian Orthodox Church - Moscow Patriarchy
 Ukrainian Orthodox Church of Canada
 Union of Brest

V 

 Valaam Monastery
 Mar Varkey Vithayathil
 Volodymyr (Viktor Sabodan) (Metropolitan)
 Velichkovsky, Paisius (Saint)

W 

 Wasyly (Metropolitan)

Y 

 Yurodivy

Eastern Christianity-related topics

Eastern Orthodoxy-related lists
Oriental Orthodoxy-related lists